ReStockIt, Inc is an online retailer of office, restaurant, and janitorial products headquartered in Davie, Florida.

The company was founded in 2004 by co-CEOs David Redlich and Matt Kuttler. The company grew quickly, and in 2006 Internet Retailer named ReStockIt the third fastest-growing internet retailer in the US.

In 2007, the company’s founders were named finalists for the Ernst & Young Florida Entrepreneur of the Year award. Additionally, ReStockIt was named to Inc. magazine’s annual ranking of the fastest-growing private companies in the country in 2008.

ReStockIt has grown its revenue from $1.1 million in 2004 to $25.5 million in 2011.

Currently ReStockIt sells products in several major category divisions, including office supplies, restaurant supplies, technology, medical supplies, and cleaning supplies. The company also carries a large segment of 'green' environmentally-friendly products across each product category.

In January 2013, the company publicly announced it was acquired by Acme Paper & Supply Co., a Baltimore-based distributor of packaging, supplies and equipment for janitorial, food-services, manufacturing, and retail industries.

References

External links 
 ReStockIt official website

American companies established in 2004
Retail companies established in 2004
Office supply retailers of the United States
Online retailers of the United States
Companies based in Florida